Sneak Me In is the seventh album by Lucifer's Friend, an album in which Mike Starrs, formerly of Colosseum II, replaced John Lawton on vocals for a second time.  This album and the previous Good Time Warrior (1978) were an attempt at a more commercial, accessible style which met with limited success.  Starrs was replaced by the returning Lawton, for 1981's Mean Machine.

Track listing

Personnel
 Mike Starrs – lead vocals
 Peter Hesslein – guitars, backing vocals
 Peter Hecht – keyboards
 Adrian Askew – keyboards, backing vocals
 Dieter Horns – bass, backing vocals
 Herbert Bornholdt – drums & percussion

External links
 Sneak Me In review & credits at AllMusic.com
 Sneak Me In at Discogs.com

1980 albums
Lucifer's Friend albums